Cretopolis or Kretopolis was a town of ancient Pisidia, Lycia, or Pamphylia, according to various ancient writers. Historians of the Wars of the Diadochi, such as Diodorus, place it in Pisidia. Ptolemy places Cretopolis in the part of Cabalia, which he attaches to Pamphylia. Polybius places it in the Milyas, Lycia. The site is unknown. The Battle of Cretopolis was fought nearby in 319 BC.

Its site is located at Buğdüz, near Yüreğil in Asiatic Turkey.

References

Populated places in Pisidia
Former populated places in Turkey
History of Burdur Province
Populated places in ancient Lycia
Populated places in ancient Pamphylia